Parabagrotis is a genus of moths in the family Noctuidae.

Species
Parabagrotis cupidissima (Grote, 1875)
Parabagrotis exertistigma (Morrison, 1874)
Parabagrotis formalis (Grote, 1874)
Parabagrotis insularis (Grote, 1876)
Parabagrotis sulinaris Lafontaine, 1998

References
Natural History Museum Lepidoptera genus database

Noctuinae